Abolfazl Shahrjerdi is an Iranian karateka competing in the men's kata event. He is a two-time medalist at the Islamic Solidarity Games and a four-time medalist at the Asian Karate Championships. He won one of the bronze medals in the men's team kata event at the 2018 World Karate Championships held in Madrid, Spain.

In 2018, he won the silver medal in the men's kata event at the World University Karate Championships held in Kobe, Japan.

He won the bronze medal in his event at the 2021 Asian Karate Championships held in Almaty, Kazakhstan.

Achievements

References

External links 
 

Living people
Year of birth missing (living people)
Place of birth missing (living people)
Iranian male karateka
Islamic Solidarity Games medalists in karate
Islamic Solidarity Games competitors for Iran
21st-century Iranian people